The Monroe White Sox were a Cotton States League baseball team based in Monroe, Louisiana, United States that existed from 1938 to 1941. They were affiliated with the Dallas Steers in 1938 and the Dallas Rebels in 1939. They played their home games at Casino Park.

Under managers Luther Harvel and Doug Taitt, they won the league championship in 1938. They won their next and final league championship in 1940, under Taitt.

One notable player is Dave Philley.

References

White Sox
Defunct Cotton States League teams
Professional baseball teams in Louisiana
1938 establishments in Louisiana
1941 disestablishments in Louisiana
Baseball teams established in 1938
Baseball teams disestablished in 1941
Defunct baseball teams in Louisiana